Paranthidium impatiens is a species of bee in the family Megachilidae, the leaf-cutter, carder, or mason bees.

Distribution
Middle America

References

Megachilidae
Insects described in 1879